Brandon Eugene Smith (born February 23, 1987) is an American football cornerback who is currently a free agent. He was signed as an undrafted free agent by the Carolina Panthers in 2011. He played college football at Arizona State.

Professional career

Carolina Panthers
On July 27, 2011, he signed with the Carolina Panthers as an undrafted free agent. On August 6, 2011, he was released.

Seattle Seahawks
On August 16, 2011, he signed with the Seattle Seahawks, and was released on August 29, 2011.

Green Bay Packers
On May 3, 2013, he signed with the Green Bay Packers. On August 31, 2013, he was released.

Buffalo Bills
On September 1, 2013, he signed with the Buffalo Bills to join practice squad.

New York Jets
Smith was signed to the New York Jets' practice squad on September 23, 2014. He was released on September 30, 2014.

BC Lions
Smith was signed to the BC Lions' practice roster on October 6, 2015. He was released by the Lions on October 9, 2015.

Montreal Alouettes
Smith was claimed by the Montreal Alouettes on October 10, 2015. He played in one game for the Alouettes in 2015.

He participated in The Spring League in 2017.

References

External links
Arizona State bio
Buffalo Bills bio

1987 births
Living people
American football cornerbacks
American football wide receivers
Canadian football defensive backs
American players of Canadian football
Arizona State Sun Devils football players
Carolina Panthers players
Buffalo Bills players
New York Jets players
BC Lions players
Montreal Alouettes players
Players of American football from Bakersfield, California
Green Bay Packers players
The Spring League players
Seattle Seahawks players